Régis Lavergne (born 28 January 1974) is a former professional tennis player from France.

Biography
Lavergne twice featured in the main draw on the ATP Tour, as a qualifier at back to back tournaments, the 1997 Grand Prix de Tennis de Toulouse and the Swiss Indoors in Basel. In both events he was beaten in the first round by countryman Fabrice Santoro.

He competed in the singles qualifying draws of all four grand slam tournaments and appeared as a lucky loser in the doubles at the 1997 Wimbledon Championships partnering Stephane Simian. His other grand slam appearance was as a wildcard pairing with veteran Guy Forget in the men's doubles at the 1998 French Open.

On the Challenger circuit he won two titles, both in doubles. At the 2002 Edinburgh Challenger he had a win over Andy Murray, 6–0, 6–1, in the qualifying draw. Murray, then aged 15, was attempting to qualify for his first Challenger event.

Challenger titles

Doubles: (2)

References

External links
 
 

1974 births
Living people
French male tennis players